Helicity may refer to:

Helicity (fluid mechanics), the extent to which corkscrew-like motion occurs
Helicity (particle physics), the projection of the spin onto the direction of momentum
Magnetic helicity, the extent to which a magnetic field "wraps around itself"
Circular dichroism, the differential absorption of left and right circularly polarized light
 A form of axial chirality
 A former name for inherent chirality

See also
Helix